Ratu Timoci Sauvoli (born 26 August 1991) is a Fijian rugby union player, currently playing for the . His preferred position is prop.

Professional career
Sauvoli was named in the Fijian Drua squad for the 2022 Super Rugby Pacific season. He had previously represented the Drua in the 2019 National Rugby Championship.

References

External links
itsrugby.co.uk Profile

1991 births
Living people
Fijian rugby union players
Rugby union props
Fijian Drua players